John Clement Carruthers (1900–1959) was an English professional footballer. A centre forward born in Howden-on-Tyne, he played in the Football League for South Shields, Bradford City, Blackpool and Crewe Alexandra, in between spells with Preston Colliery.

References 

1900 births
1959 deaths
Sportspeople from Wallsend
Footballers from Tyne and Wear
Association football forwards
English footballers
North Shields F.C. players
South Shields F.C. (1889) players
Bradford City A.F.C. players
Crewe Alexandra F.C. players
Blackpool F.C. players
English Football League players